Pennsylvania State Senate District 29 includes part of Luzerne County and all of Carbon County and Schuylkill County. It is currently represented by Republican Dave Argall.

District profile
The district includes the following areas:

All of Carbon County

Luzerne County

 Bear Creek Township
 Bear Creek Village
 Buck Township
 Dennison Township
 Foster Township
 Freeland
 Hazle Township
 Hazleton
 Jeddo
 Penn Lake Park
 West Hazleton
 White Haven

All of Schuylkill County

Senators

References

Pennsylvania Senate districts
Government of Berks County, Pennsylvania
Government of Schuylkill County, Pennsylvania